Thomas Pincerna, also known as Thomas Butler was Archdeacon of Totnes from 1238 to 1254.

References

Archdeacons of Totnes
13th-century English clergy